Erase Errata was a band from San Francisco, California. The group favored improvisation as a compositional tool and each of their performances were a unique manifestation of established songs.

History
Erase Errata formed in Oakland, California in 1999 and quickly earned national attention after the release of their first eponymous 7" and via tours with electro grrl band Le Tigre and Japanese noise rockers Melt Banana.  They released their highly acclaimed debut album Other Animals in 2001, followed by At Crystal Palace in 2003, both on the Troubleman Unlimited label.  The group began counting Sonic Youth, Mission of Burma and The Ex among their fans.

After founding guitarist Sara Jaffe left Erase Errata in 2004, singer Jenny Hoyston switched to guitar and the group briefly drafted a male vocalist named Archie McKay.  The group eventually settled on a three-piece lineup, with Hoyston handling both guitar and vocal duties, and joined the Kill Rock Stars roster for the 2006 album Nightlife.

Personnel
Current members
Jenny Hoyston - vocals, guitar, trumpet, keyboards
Ellie Erickson - bass
Bianca Sparta - drums
Former Members
Sara Jaffe - guitar (1999–2004, sporadic live appearances since)
Archie Mckay - vocals (July, August 2004 only)

Discography

Studio albums
Other Animals (2001)
At Crystal Palace (2003)
Nightlife (2006)
Lost Weekend (2015)

Singles
 "Erase Errata" (2000) Inconvenient Press
 "The Structure of Scientific Misconceptions" (2001) Toyo
 7" split single with Black Dice (2001) Troubleman
 7" compilation feat. Erase Errata, Peaches, xbxrx, Tracy & the Plastics and more (2002) NFJM
 7" split single with Numbers (2002) Tigerbeat6
"Mariah Carey and the Arthur Doyle Hand Cream"/"Glitter" split single with Sonic Youth (2003) Narnack
 7" split single with Gossip (2004) KRS
 7" "Clear Spot" b/w "Pass The Crimson" (2007) TomLab
 7" "Damaged" b/w "Ouijaboardin'" (2010) KRS

Compilations
Rough Trade Shops: Post Punk Vol. 1, 2001
Fields And Streams, Kill Rock Stars, 2002

References

External links

Official site
Factsheet from Kill Rock Stars
interview by Kim Gordon for Index Magazine
PUNKCAST#1062 live video from Syrup Room, Brooklyn, Nov 3 2006.

All-female punk bands
Rock music groups from California
American noise rock music groups
American musical trios
Kill Rock Stars artists
Musical groups established in 1999
Riot grrrl bands
Blast First artists
1999 establishments in California